Gordon Oliver (April 27, 1910 – January 26, 1995) was an American actor and film producer. He appeared in more than 40 films and television shows between 1933 and 1972.

Biography
Oliver began working in films in 1936, eventually working for Warner Bros., Columbia and RKO. He went on to appear in approximately 25 films. Oliver was executive producer of It Takes a Thief, Peter Gunn, Mr. Lucky, and Mr. Adams and Eve. On-screen, he was co-host of Mobil Theatre and Douglas Fairbanks, Jr., Presents.

Oliver was married to model Elsa Oliver for 46 years. They had a son, Angus Duncan, and a daughter, Elsa Lambert. He died of emphysema January 26, 1995, at Cedars-Sinai Medical Center in Los Angeles, California. He was interred at Hollywood Forever Cemetery. Oliver was survived by his wife, a son, and a daughter.

Partial filmography

As actor, unless otherwise noted.
 The Sweetheart of Sigma Chi (1933) - Student (uncredited)
 Fugitive in the Sky (1936) - Bob White
 Once a Doctor (1937) - Dr. Jerry Brace
 Draegerman Courage (1937) - Pete Lawson
 The Go Getter (1937) - Luce
 San Quentin (1937) - Captain
 The Case of the Stuttering Bishop (1937) - Philip Brownley
 Fly-Away Baby (1937) - Lucien 'Sonny' Croy
 White Bondage (1937) - Dave Graydon
 Youth on Parole (1937) - Phillip Henderson
 Alcatraz Island (1937) - George Drake
 Over the Goal (1937) - Benton
 West of Shanghai (1937) - Jim Hallet
 Expensive Husbands (1937) - Ricky Preston
 Daredevil Drivers (1938) - Mark Banning
 Jezebel (1938) - Dick Allen
 Women Are Like That (1938) - Howard Johns
 The Marines Are Here (1938) - Corporal Dick Jones
 Brother Rat (1938) - Capt 'Lacedrawers' Rogers
 Blondie (1938) - Chester Franey
 There's That Woman Again (1938) - Charles Crenshaw
 Pride of the Navy (1939) - Jerry Richards
 My Son Is a Criminal (1939) - Allen Coltrin
 Romance of the Redwoods (1939) - Jed Malone
 A Woman Is the Judge (1939) - Robert Langley
 Sabotage (1939) - Tommy Grayson
 Sweetheart of the Campus (1941) - Terry Jones
 Follies Girl (1943) - Pvt. Jerry Hamlin
 Passport to Destiny (1944) - Capt. Franz von Weber
 Seven Days Ashore (1944) - Dan Arland Jr.
 Since You Went Away (1944) - Marine Officer Seeking Room
 Heavenly Days (1944) - Dick Martin
 The Spiral Staircase (1946) - Steve Warren
 Station West (1948) - Prince
 Born to Be Bad (1950) - The Lawyer
 My Forbidden Past (1951) - Clay Duchesne
 The Las Vegas Story (1952) - Mr. Drucker
 Code Name: Heraclitus (1967, producer)
 Cancel My Reservation (1972) - Mr. Willie Sparker

Radio appearances

References

External links

1910 births
1995 deaths
American male film actors
Film producers from California
Male actors from Los Angeles
20th-century American male actors
20th-century American businesspeople
Burials at Hollywood Forever Cemetery
Deaths from emphysema